The Invincibles may refer to:

Sport
 The Invincibles (Australian rules football), the 1914 Port Adelaide team
 The Invincibles (cricket), the 1948 Australian team
 The Invincibles (English football), the 1888–89 Preston North End and 2003–04 Arsenal teams
 The Invincibles (rugby league), the 1982 Australian team
 The Invincibles (rugby union), the 1924–25 New Zealand team

Other uses
 Les Invincibles, a French-Canadian TV series
 Irish National Invincibles, a group of extremist Irish Republicans in the 1880s

See also
 Invincible (disambiguation)
 The Incredibles (disambiguation)
 The Invisibles (disambiguation)